Alessandro Della Valle (born 8 June 1982) is a former Sammarinese footballer who last played with A.C. Juvenes/Dogana and formerly the San Marino national football team. He scored San Marino's first competitive goal in 5 years against Poland in the 2014 FIFA World Cup qualification on 10 September 2013.

International goals

Score and Result lists San Marino's goals first

References

External links

1982 births
Living people
Sammarinese footballers
San Marino international footballers
A.S.D. Victor San Marino players
S.S. Folgore Falciano Calcio players
A.C. Juvenes/Dogana players
Association football defenders